The 1971 Embassy British Indoor Championships was a combined men's and women's Grand Prix tennis tournament played on indoor carpet courts. The event was categorized as a B Class tournament and was the 4th edition of the British Indoor Championships in the Open era. The tournament took place at the Wembley Arena in London in England and ran from 23 October through 30 October 1971.

The men's singles event was won by unseeded Ilie Năstase who received 30 Grand Prix ranking points for his tournament victory. Billie Jean King won the women's singles title.

Finals

Men's singles
 Ilie Năstase defeated  Rod Laver 3–6, 6–3, 3–6, 6–4, 6–4
 It was Năstase's 6th title of the year and the 7th of his open era career.

Women's singles
 Billie Jean King defeated  Françoise Dürr 6–1, 5–7, 7–5

Men's doubles
 Bob Hewitt /  Frew McMillan defeated  Bill Bowrey /  Owen Davidson 7–5, 9–7, 6–2

Women's doubles
 Françoise Dürr /  Virginia Wade defeated  Evonne Goolagong /  Julie Heldman 3–6, 7–5, 6–3

References

External links 
 ITF tournament edition  details

British Indoor Championships
Wembley Championships
Embassy British Indoor Championships
Embassy British Indoor Championships
Embassy British Indoor Championships
Tennis in London